Pascal Thomas (born 2 April 1945) is a French screenwriter and film director. His 1999 film The Dilettante was entered into the 21st Moscow International Film Festival.

Selected filmography
 Pleure pas la bouche pleine! (1973)
 Les Maris, les Femmes, les Amants (1989)
 La pagaille (1991)
 La Dilettante (1999)
 Day Off (2001)
 Mon petit doigt m'a dit... (2005)
 L'heure zéro (2007)
 Le crime est notre affaire (2008)
 Valentin Valentin (2015)

References

External links

1945 births
Living people
French film directors
French male screenwriters
French screenwriters